The men's 3000 metres event  at the 1993 IAAF World Indoor Championships was held on 12 and 14 March.

Medalists

Results

Heats
First 2 of each heat (Q) and next 4 fastest (q) qualified for the final.

Final

References

3000
3000 metres at the World Athletics Indoor Championships